The 2017–18 ECHL season is the 30th season of the ECHL. The regular season ran from October 13, 2017 to April 8, 2018, with the 2018 Kelly Cup playoffs following. Twenty-seven teams in 21 states and one Canadian province each played a 72-game schedule.

The Kelly Cup was won by the Colorado Eagles, playing in their last season in the ECHL before joining the American Hockey League, in seven games over the regular season champions, the Florida Everblades.

League business

Team changes 
The Alaska Aces, three-time Kelly Cup champions and one of the last two teams remaining from the West Coast Hockey League, ceased operations. The franchise was later purchased and relocated to Portland, Maine, for the 2018–19 season.
The Elmira Jackals had been losing money, suffering from ownership issues since 2012, and county operated since 2016. The county agency operating the team and arena had an agreement to sell the arena to a new owner, but the owner did not want the Jackals and the team ceased operations.
The Missouri Mavericks were renamed as the Kansas City Mavericks.
The Jacksonville Icemen (formerly the Evansville IceMen) rejoined after a one-year hiatus.
The Worcester Railers are added as an expansion team. As with many of the 2015–16 season changes, the franchise replaces a former American Hockey League team, the Worcester Sharks.

Conference realignment 
With the addition of another ECHL team in the South, the Jacksonville Icemen, the Cincinnati Cyclones returned to the Western Conference and Central Division after one season in the Eastern Conference. The Worcester Railers took the North Division spot vacated by the folded Elmira Jackals. The Western Conference divisions were reshuffled with the Kansas City Mavericks moving to the Central while the Tulsa Oilers and Wichita Thunder joined the Mountain Division.

Affiliation changes

Annual Board of Governors meeting
The annual ECHL Board of Governors meeting were held at the New York-New York Hotel and Casino in Las Vegas, Nevada, on June 12 and 13, 2017. The ECHL Board of Governors re-elected Cincinnati Cyclones' president Ray Harris as chairman for a third season. The Board also approved of the transfer of the Alaska Aces franchise to Portland, Maine, for the 2018–19 season as well as the 2017–18 alignment.

All-star game
The 2018 CCM/ECHL All-Star Classic was held on January 15, 2018, at the Indiana Farmers Coliseum in Indianapolis. In a change from previous all-star game formats used by the ECHL, the league used the divisional format that has been used in the NHL and AHL since 2016. There were four teams, one for each division, playing a 3-on-3 player tournament with the winners of each conference match facing each other for a final game. Each game consisted of two seven-minute periods and each team was made up from seven players. In the semifinal round, the South Division defeated the North Division 3–1 and the Mountain Division defeated the Central Division 5–2.

The skills competition took place before the all-star championship game. The Cincinnati Cyclones' Justin Danforth won the fastest skater event, the Wichita Thunder's Shane Starrett won the rapid fire event, and the Orlando Solar Bears' Nolan Valleau won the hardest shot event.

The championship game was then played with the Mountain Division defeating the South Division after going into a shootout by a final score of 6–5. The South Carolina Stingrays' Taylor Cammarata of the South Division won the tournament's most valuable player award.

Standings

Final standings.

Eastern Conference

Western Conference

 - clinched playoff spot,  - clinched regular season division title,  - Brabham Cup (regular season) champion

Postseason

Playoffs format
At the end of the regular season the top four teams in each division qualifies for the 2018 Kelly Cup playoffs and be seeded one through four based on highest point total earned in the season. Then the first two rounds of the playoffs are held within the division with the first seed facing the fourth seed and the second seed facing the third. The division champions then play each other in a conference championship. The Kelly Cup finals pits the Eastern Conference champion against the Western Conference champion.  All four rounds are a best-of-seven format.

Bracket

Awards

All-ECHL teams
First Team
Parker Milner (G) – South Carolina Stingrays
David Makowski (D) – Allen Americans
Matt Register (D) – Colorado Eagles
Michael Joly (F) – Colorado Eagles
Jordan LeVallee-Smotherman (F) – Manchester Monarchs
Shawn Szydlowski (F) – Fort Wayne Komets

Second Team
Pat Nagle (G) – Toledo Walleye
Eric Knodel (D) – Cincinnati Cyclones
Nolan Zajac (D) – Reading Royals
Justin Danforth (F) – Cincinnati Cyclones
Jesse Schultz (F) – Cincinnati Cyclones
Matt Willows (F) – Reading Royals

Rookie Team
Mitch Gillam (G) – Worcester Railers
Aaron Irving (D) – Kalamazoo Wings
TJ Melancon (D) – Norfolk Admirals
Grant Besse (F) – Norfolk Admirals
Justin Danforth (F) – Cincinnati Cyclones
Reid Gardiner (F) – Wheeling Nailers

See also 
2017 in sports
2018 in sports

References

External links
ECHL website

 
2017-18
3
3